Twenty-six amphibian species are found in Michigan, one of the fifty United States. These species include twelve species of frog, twelve species of salamander and two species of toad, all members of the class Amphibia. Blanchard's cricket frog, a subspecies of northern cricket frog, is considered to be threatened and two species, the marbled salamander and small-mouth salamander, are considered endangered; these are protected under the Endangered Species Act of the State of Michigan. Two more species, the boreal chorus frog and lesser siren, are considered to be of special concern, although they are not protected under the act. There are no amphibians native to Michigan that are included in the federal Endangered Species Act.

Of the over 3400 species of frog and toad worldwide, the majority live in the tropics. However, Michigan's species live where it is often cold, necessitating adaptions to freezing weather due to their ectothermic (cold-blooded) nature. Most frogs and toads become dormant in the winter; some frogs can withstand short periods of freezing conditions, but this is not true of all species. Some species of salamander also hibernate during the winter, while other fully aquatic species remain active throughout the year. Amphibians are vulnerable to many types of human encroachment, including water pollution, automobiles, the destruction of wetlands through farming and the use of off-road vehicles and chemical pesticides. In Michigan, wetlands protection legislation is in place to prevent pollution and destruction, while additional wetlands are being reclaimed and restored after agricultural usage has ceased.

Amphibian habitats in Michigan are generally split into four regions: the northern and southern Lower Peninsula and the eastern and western Upper Peninsula, with differentiation based on climate, soils, underlying bedrock and glacially-derived landforms. Region One, the southern Lower Peninsula, is generally characterized by a warmer, less variable climate. Loam and clay soils dominate the region, with a lesser amount of sand, and deciduous hardwoods are the dominant tree species, with some natural prairies and savannas. There is a greater diversity of plant life in this region, and it includes plant and animal species that are not found in any of the other regions. Region Two, the northern Lower Peninsula, has a climate that is cooler and more variable, with greater precipitation, due to its proximity to the Great Lakes, more extensive uplands and more northern latitude. Sandy soils and glacial deposits are the dominant soil type, while forests of conifer or mixed conifer/hardwood predominate. Swamps and bogs are found more often in Region Two than Region One. Region Three, the eastern Upper Peninsula, has a climate profile similar to Region Two. Sand and clay dominate the soil of this region, and tend to be low in nutrients and poorly drained. There are extensive wetlands, dominated by coniferous forests, while upland areas provide mixed conifer/broadleaf hardwood tracts. Region Four, the western Upper Peninsula, provides extensive bedrock structures. The temperature is less moderate than in the other three regions, and can see frigid winters and hot summers. Mixed conifer/broadleaf forests again predominate.

Frogs

Salamanders

Toads

See also

List of fauna of Michigan

References
General references

Specific references

Michigan
Amphibians
.Amphibians
.Amphibians